Liptena pearmani, the Pearman's liptena, is a butterfly in the family Lycaenidae. It is found in Ghana (the Volta Region), Togo and western Nigeria. The habitat consists of forests.

References

Butterflies described in 1974
Liptena